The 1995 Stanley Cup Finals was the championship series of the National Hockey League's (NHL) 1994–95 season, and the culmination of the 1995 Stanley Cup playoffs. It was contested by the Eastern Conference champion New Jersey Devils and the Western Conference champion Detroit Red Wings. This was the first of nine consecutive Finals to feature only American-based franchises. New Jersey was making the franchise's first appearance in the Finals, while Detroit returned to the Finals for the first time since  (and had not won since ; both of those appearances had been against the Montreal Canadiens). The Devils swept the series four games to none to win their first Stanley Cup in franchise history in their twenty-first season, and they became the sixth team to earn a championship after joining the league in 1967 or later. It was the first of four consecutive sweeps in the finals. 

Despite the fact that the regular season was cut short by the owners' lockout, both the season and the Finals were saved at the eleventh hour – this was the latest date that the Stanley Cup was awarded. Their regular season winning percentage was also the lowest for a Cup winner since the 1966–67 Toronto Maple Leafs.

This was the first Cup Finals since 1980 to be played entirely within one time zone.

Paths to the Finals

To get to the Finals, New Jersey defeated the Boston Bruins 4–1, the Pittsburgh Penguins 4–1, and their rival the Philadelphia Flyers 4–2.

Detroit defeated the Dallas Stars 4–1, the San Jose Sharks 4–0, and then division rival Chicago Blackhawks 4–1.

Game summaries

Game one

The series opened on Saturday, June 17 at the Joe Louis Arena in Detroit. Few gave New Jersey much of a chance against the NHL's best team. Going into the game, Detroit was a perfect 8–0 at home in the playoffs, and had outscored their opponents 30–11 in their eight home games. In the first three rounds alone the Red Wings had scored 18 power-play goals. Detroit fans, first greeting their opponents with a chorus of boos, then chanted after every Devils name was read during introductions, "Who cares?"

After a scoreless first period, the underdog Devils got on the board first, when Stephane Richer blasted a slap shot from the top of the right circle that just squeezed through Detroit goaltender Mike Vernon. The power-play goal came at 9:41 of the second period and gave New Jersey a 1–0 lead. The Red Wings responded less than four minutes later and tied the game on a power-play goal by Dino Ciccarelli at 13:08. The Devils would regain the lead on a goal by Claude Lemieux, a slapper from the slot at 3:17 of the third period. New Jersey would go on to win the game 2–1 and take a one-game-to-none series lead. They played a solid defensive game, frustrating the Red Wings and holding them to just 17 shots. The win was their ninth road win of the playoffs.

Game two

In game two, Detroit played with a sense of urgency. Vyacheslav Kozlov scored on the power play at 7:17 of the second period to make the score 1–0 in favor of the Red Wings. Devils forward John MacLean would tie the game at 1–1 less than two and a half minutes later with a goal at 9:40. Then, on a Detroit breakaway, New Jersey defenceman and captain Scott Stevens laid a thundering body check on Kozlov as he made a move to the inside past the New Jersey blue line. Although the Red Wings regained the lead on Sergei Fedorov's goal at 1:36 of the third period, the Stevens hit seemed to inspire the Devils. With the midway point of the third period approaching, New Jersey defenceman Scott Niedermayer picked up the puck in his own zone and skated up the ice. Once over the Detroit blue line, he got a step on Detroit defenceman Paul Coffey and fired a shot towards the Detroit net. Although the puck missed the net, it bounced off the end boards and came right back to Niedermayer, who shot it past Mike Vernon to tie the game at 2–2. The game remained tied until late in the third period. Devils defenceman Shawn Chambers fired a shot from the point and the rebound came right to Jim Dowd who backhanded the puck into the net to give the Devils a 3–2 lead. Stéphane Richer would add an empty-net goal as New Jersey won, 4–2.

Game three

Game three, the very first NHL game ever played after the official summer solstice, shifted the series back to the Meadowlands in East Rutherford, New Jersey. During game one, the Detroit crowd taunted the Devils by collectively jeering "Who cares?" after each player was introduced. The Devils fans countered by raining boos down on the visiting Red Wings and delivering chants of "Red Wings suck." The Devils did their talking on the ice, dominating the Red Wings, scoring five consecutive goals. Bruce Driver, Claude Lemieux, Neal Broten, Randy McKay and Bobby Holik all scored to give the Devils a 5–0 lead with 11:46 remaining in the game. Detroit scored twice on power-play goals by Sergei Fedorov and Steve Yzerman at 16:57 and 18:27 of the third period, but it was insufficient to keep New Jersey from winning a 5–2 game. They now had a commanding three-games-to-none lead in the series.

Game four

The Devils jumped out to a 1–0 lead on Neal Broten's goal just 68 seconds into the game. However, the Red Wings were fighting to stay alive and tied the game on Sergei Fedorov's goal just 55 seconds later. Coffey scored a shorthanded goal at 13:01 to give Detroit a 2–1 lead. New Jersey responded less than five minutes later, at 17:45 on a slap-shot goal by Shawn Chambers that beat Mike Vernon glove-side. Then, in the second period, Scott Niedermayer passed to Broten, who chipped the puck over Vernon's glove from just in front of the net. The goal, Broten's second of the game, gave the Devils a 3–2 lead. New Jersey would increase its lead with goals by Sergei Brylin and Chambers (his second of the game) at 7:46 and 12:32 of the third period. The Devils won the game 5–2 and the series four games to none. It was New Jersey's first Stanley Cup Championship in team history. Devils goaltender Martin Brodeur allowed just seven goals against the Red Wings in the series and Devils forward Claude Lemieux was awarded the Conn Smythe Trophy as playoff MVP, having led all skaters in playoff goals with 13. He would win the Stanley Cup again the very next season with the Colorado Avalanche.

Broadcasting
This was the first year that coverage of the Cup Finals in the United States was split between Fox and ESPN. Fox broadcast games one and four with Mike Emrick and John Davidson, while ESPN broadcast games two and three with Gary Thorne and Bill Clement. This was also the first Cup Finals in which the U.S. national networks had exclusive rights, and no longer could any of the regional rights holders of the participating U.S. teams produce local telecasts of their respective games. However, because the Devils swept the Red Wings and game four of the series was on Fox, their television play-by-play announcer, Emrick, called the win, as he also was part of Fox's lead broadcast team. In the New York City area, the game drew a 10.6 rating and 21 share and in Detroit, 14.1 and 26.

In Canada, Bob Cole and Harry Neale were in the broadcast booth for CBC.

On the radio side, the series was broadcast continentally on NHL Radio with Kenny Albert and Gary Green announcing. Devils team broadcasters Mike Miller and Sherry Ross called the series on local radio on WABC–AM 770 in New York City and Red Wings team broadcasters Bruce Martyn and Paul Woods called the series on local radio on WJR–AM 760 in Detroit.

Team rosters

Detroit Red Wings

New Jersey Devils

Stanley Cup engraving
The 1995 Stanley Cup was presented to Devils captain Scott Stevens by NHL Commissioner Gary Bettman following the Devils 5–2 win over the Red Wings in game four

The following Devils players and staff had their names engraved on the Stanley Cup

1994–95 New Jersey Devils

Aftermath
The following season, the Devils missed the playoffs becoming the first defending Stanley Cup champion to miss the playoffs after the Montreal Canadiens in 1970.

The Red Wings, on the other hand, won a league record 62 games. But lost in the conference finals in six games to the Colorado Avalanche.

See also
1994–95 NHL season
1994–95 Detroit Red Wings season
1994–95 New Jersey Devils season
1995 Stanley Cup playoffs
List of Stanley Cup champions

Notes

References

 
Stanley Cup
Detroit Red Wings games
New Jersey Devils games
Stanley Cup Finals
Sports competitions in East Rutherford, New Jersey
20th century in East Rutherford, New Jersey
Stanley Cup Finals
Stanley Cup Finals
Stanley Cup Finals
Ice hockey competitions in Detroit
Stanley Cup Finals
Ice hockey competitions in New Jersey